The Librarian is a series of original fantasy-adventure made-for-television films from Turner Network Television (TNT) starring Noah Wyle as the Librarian, who protects a secret collection of artifacts.

Development 
Dean Devlin, through his production company Electric Entertainment, brought David Titcher's original pitch to TNT.  David Titcher wrote and created the original movie that sequels were based on. The director of the first film was Peter Winther, and writer/creator David Titcher co-produced with  Marc Roskin and Kearie Peak. In 2004, they planned to produce three Librarian films with ER star Noah Wyle.

"Dean's pitch was a refreshing take on the hero story", TNT's Senior Vice President of Original Programming Michael Wright said. "Instead of a muscle-bound, spandex-clad superman, we get an insecure but brilliant guy who thinks he's taking a safe job as a librarian, but instead gets taken on a ride in a world we'd like to believe exists."

Television films

The Librarian: Quest for the Spear (2004) 

Quest for the Spear introduces Flynn Carsen (Noah Wyle), who is hired by the Metropolitan Public Library as The Librarian. What Flynn does not realize is that the library has existed for centuries and protects a range of historical and often magical items in a secret section of the library, including The Ark of the Covenant, Pandora's box, and Excalibur. When part of the Spear of Destiny is stolen from the library, Flynn must recover it with the help of Nicole Noone.

The Librarian: Return to King Solomon's Mines (2006) 

Return to King Solomon's Mines begins with Flynn's attending a party at his mother's house, where he meets up with his "Uncle" Jerry, a close friend of his late father. Soon Flynn is on a quest to locate King Solomon's Mines, and along the way he teams up with Emily Davenport, an archaeologist who helps Flynn translate the Akon (aklo algolis) language. When they meet up with Jerry in Kenya, all is not what it seems.

The Librarian: Curse of the Judas Chalice (2008) 

Curse of the Judas Chalice finds Flynn experiencing a strange dream which leads him to New Orleans, where he finds himself in the way of a Russian conspiracy that involves the notorious vampire Prince Vlad Dracul. Once again, Flynn must overcome his fears and protect one of the world's most powerful and dangerous artifacts, the Judas Chalice, or face the consequences of it falling into the wrong hands.

Television series

The Librarians (2014–2018) 

TNT ordered a ten-episode weekly series version of The Librarian, following the original cast that includes Noah Wyle, Bob Newhart and Jane Curtin, as well as four new characters who work for The Library. A teaser trailer aired right after the Falling Skies season finale. The series premiered on December 7, 2014.

The new characters are:
 Colonel Eve Baird (Rebecca Romijn), who is a counter-terrorism agent who protects the group.
 Jacob Stone (Christian Kane), who has an IQ of 190 and extensive knowledge of art history.
 Cassandra Killian (Lindy Booth), who has the special gift of auditory and sensory hallucinations linked to memory retrieval known as synesthesia.
 Ezekiel Jones (John Kim), "a master of technologies" and fan of classic crimes who enjoys playing the role of international man of mystery.

Jenkins (John Larroquette) serves as the quartet's reluctant, sometimes cantankerous caretaker; he has worked at The Library's branch office "for longer than anyone knows" and has extensive knowledge of ancient lore. The quartet battles the Serpent Brotherhood, a cult led by the mysterious immortal Dulaque, a recurring character played by Matt Frewer.

The series was filmed in Portland, Oregon. On February 12, 2015, it was announced that the series had been renewed for a second ten-episode season. It premiered on November 1, 2015. In December 2015, it was announced that the series would be renewed for a third season.  On January 24, 2017, TNT renewed the series for a fourth season. In March 2018, the series was cancelled for unknown reasons.

Books

The Adventures of the Librarian: Quest for the Spear  
A novelization of the first movie was adapted by Christopher Tracy as The Adventures of the Librarian: Quest for the Spear, which was published in 2004.

The Librarians tie-in novels

Three tie-in novels have been published, all written by Greg Cox:

 The Librarians and the Lost Lamp (2016) follows the characters of the television series as they attempt to find Aladdin's lamp, in both the past and the future.  
 In The Librarians and the Mother Goose Chase (2017) the characters attempt to find various sections of the original Mother Goose story book before a descendant of the original Mother Goose is able to recombine the parts and use its power. 
 In The Librarians and the Pot of Gold (2019), the Serpent Brotherhood have returned, and the Librarians learn the truth behind the story of St. Patrick driving the “snakes” out of Éire. He had the help of a Librarian.

Comic books

The Librarian
Released in November 2006, Electric Entertainment and Atlantis Studios produced a graphic novel adaptation of Return to King Solomon's Mines. The adaption was written by James Watson and illustrated by Nate Pride.

Electric Entertainment and Atlantis Studios additionally signed an exclusive worldwide agreement to produce an original comic book series based on The Librarian characters. "Comics are great opportunities to explore mythology, history, and each character in a way we could never do on film," said Executive Producer Dean Devlin. "There are thousands of artifacts in the Library – each one a new adventure. Based on the response we’ve had from the first film, fans of all ages loved the characters and want to see more. This series will give it to them."

The Librarians
On June 20, 2017, writer Will Pfeifer and  artist Rodney Buchemi were announced as creators of a new comic book series from Dynamite Entertainment, based on The Librarians. The series is set to launch on September 13. The final issue was released December 13, 2017.

Film 
In 2009 Producer Dean Devlin had indicated that the next entry in The Librarian series would be a theatrical release. Shooting was planned for some time in 2009. However, actor Noah Wyle later said in an interview at the 2010 San Diego Comic-Con that shooting had not begun and there were no immediate plans for a theatrical release of the next film in the series.

Characters

Mythology of The Librarian 

The Librarians are the guardians of powerful and magical relics, having been for centuries, and often undertake globe-spanning adventures to recover items and store them in the Library. Some of the relics in the Library include: the original Mona Lisa, Excalibur, the Ark of the Covenant, the Fountain of Youth, the Nautilus, Noah's Ark, Pan's flute, Pandora's box, Poseidon's trident, and the Shroud of Turin. There are also living assets within the Library; for example, the Loch Ness Monster can be seen in the water around the "tree" made of walkways at the end of the Judas Chalice adventure.

Awards

The Librarian: Quest for the Spear

Nominated 
 Saturn Award (2005): Best Actor on Television (Noah Wyle), Best Supporting Actor on Television (Kyle MacLachlan), Best Supporting Actress on Television (Sonya Walger), and Best Television Presentation
 Motion Picture Sound Editors (2005): Golden Reel Award for Best Sound Editing in Television Long Form – Sound Effects & Foley.
 Visual Effects Society Awards (2005): VES Award for Outstanding Compositing in a Broadcast Program
 Writers Guild of America (2006): WGA Award for Long Form – Original (David N. Titcher)

The Librarian: Return to King Solomon's Mines

Won 
 Saturn Award (2007): Best Presentation on Television.

Nominated 
 Saturn Award (2007): Best Actor on Television (Noah Wyle), and Best Supporting Actress on Television (Gabrielle Anwar).
 American Society of Cinematographers (2007): ASC Award for Outstanding Achievement in Cinematography in Movies of the Week/Mini-Series/Pilot (Walt Lloyd)
 Broadcast Film Critics Association Awards (2007): Critics Choice Award for Best Picture Made for Television
 Emmy Awards (2007): Outstanding Music Composition for a Miniseries, Movie or a Special (Joseph LoDuca), and Outstanding Sound Editing for a Miniseries, Movie or a Special

See also 
 Indiana Jones
 The Invisible Library series
Tomb Raider
 Warehouse 13
 Relic Hunter

References

External links 
 
 TNT homepage for The Librarian: Quest for the Spear
  TNT homepage for The Librarian: Return to King Solomon's Mines
 USA Today

 
American television films
Treasure hunt films
Treasure hunt television series
American adventure films
2010s adventure films
2000s adventure films
2000s American films
2010s American films